HD 82205 (HR 3770) is a solitary star in the southern constellation Antlia. It is faintly visible to the naked eye with an apparent magnitude of 5.48 and is estimated to be 810 light years distant based on parallax measurements.

HD 82205 has a general stellar classification of K3 III, indicating that it is a red giant. However, Houk and Cowley (1982) found a slightly warmer class of K2 III CNII, which also suggests a strong overabundance of cyano radicals in the stellar atmosphere. At present it has 4.46 times the mass of the Sun but has expanded to 38.9 times its girth. HD 82205 has a metallicity 123% that of the Sun and is believed to be a member of the thin disk population.

The object was first noticed by T.J.J See in 1897.

References

External links
 Image HD 82205

Antlia
082205
Double stars
K-type giants
3770
046578
CD-26 07117
Antliae, 3